Aban b. 'Abd al-Hamid al-Lahiqi (al-Raqashi) of Basra ( 750–815 or 816) was a Persian court poet of the Barmakids in Baghdad. He set into Arabic verse popular stories of Indian and Persian origin. He was suspected of Manichaeism.

References

9th-century Persian-language poets
750s births
810s deaths
8th-century Iranian people
9th-century Iranian people
8th-century Arabic writers
9th-century Arabic writers
8th-century people from the Abbasid Caliphate
9th-century people from the Abbasid Caliphate
Poets from the Abbasid Caliphate